Lysogorka is a rural locality (a village) in Ziriklinsky Selsoviet, Bizhbulyaksky District, Bashkortostan, Russia. The population was 158 as of 2010. There are 2 streets.

Geography 
Lysogorka is located 23 km west of Bizhbulyak (the district's administrative centre) by road. Maly Sedyak is the nearest rural locality.

References 

Rural localities in Bizhbulyaksky District